Radium bromide is the bromide salt of radium, with the formula RaBr2. It is produced during the process of separating radium from uranium ore. This inorganic compound was discovered by Pierre and Marie Curie in 1898, and the discovery sparked a huge interest in radiochemistry and radiotherapy. Since elemental radium oxidizes readily in air and water, radium salts are the preferred chemical form of radium to work with. Even though it is more stable than elemental radium, radium bromide is still extremely toxic, and can explode under certain conditions.

History

After the Curies discovered radium (in the form of radium chloride) in 1898, scientists began to isolate radium on an industrial scale, with the intent of using it for radiotherapy treatments. Radium salts, including radium bromide, were most often used by placing the chemical in a tube that was then passed over or inserted into diseased tissue in the body. Many of the first scientists to try to determine radium's uses were affected by their exposure to the radioactive material. Pierre Curie went so far as to self-inflict a severe chemical skin reaction by applying a radium source directly to his forearm, which ultimately created a skin lesion.  All types of therapeutic tests were performed for different skin diseases including eczema, lichen and psoriasis. Later, it was hypothesized that radium could be used to treat cancerous diseases.

However, during this time frame, radium also gained popularity among pseudoscientific "health remedy" industries, which promoted radium as an essential element that could "heal" and "reinvigorate" cells in the human body and remove poisonous substances. As a result, radium gained popularity as a "health trend" in the 1920s and radium salts were added to food, drinks, clothing, toys, and even toothpaste. Furthermore, many respectable journals and newspapers in the early 1900s published statements claiming that radium posed no health hazard.

The main problem with the explosion of interest in radium was the lack of radium on earth itself. In 1913, it was reported that the Radium Institute had four grams of radium total, which at the time was more than half the world supply. Numerous countries and institutions across the world set out to extract as much radium as possible, a time-consuming and expensive task. It was reported in Science magazine in 1919 that the United States had produced approximately 55 grams of radium since 1913, which was also more than half the radium produced in the world at the time. A principal source for radium is pitchblende, which holds a total of 257 mg of radium per ton of U3O8. With so little product recovered from such a large amount of material, it was difficult to extract a large quantity of radium. This was the reason radium bromide became one of the most expensive materials on earth. In 1921, it was stated in Time magazine that one ton of radium cost 17,000,000,000 Euros, whereas one ton of gold cost 208,000 Euros and one ton of diamond cost 400,000,000 Euros. 

Radium bromide was also found to induce phosphorescence at normal temperatures. This led to the US army manufacturing and supplying luminous watches and gun sights to soldiers. It also allowed for the invention of the spinthariscope, which soon became a popular household item.

Properties

Radium bromide is a luminous salt that causes the air surrounding it, even when encased in a tube, to glow a brilliant green and demonstrate all bands of the nitrogen spectrum. It is possible that the effect of the alpha radiation on the nitrogen in the air causes this luminescence.  Radium bromide is highly reactive and crystals can sometimes explode, especially if heated. Helium gas evolved from alpha particles can accumulate within the crystals, which can cause them to weaken and rupture.

Radium bromide will crystallize when separated from aqueous solution. It forms a dihydrate, very similar to barium bromide.

Production

Radium bromide is not found in nature; it is created. To extract radium from uranium or pitchblende ores, the most common practice is the "Curie method", which involves two major stages. The first stage is treating uranium ore with a chemical to concentrate the radium as a combination of radium and barium. This is done by treating the ore with a barium salt and sulfuric acid which make the uranium, iron, copper, and other components within the ore become water-soluble and are drained away. A residue containing gangue, barium, radium, and lead sulfates is left over. The mixture will then be treated with sodium chloride  and sodium carbonate to remove the lead and convert radium and barium into carbonates that are insoluble in hydrochloric acid. 

The second step requires fractional crystallization to separate the barium from the radium. Because radium and barium have different miscibility in bromine or chlorine, those two chemicals are chosen for the fractional crystallization, and enables the two elements to be separated, leaving behind an aqueous solution of radium bromide or radium chloride. 
Once the radium is separated, the aqueous radium solution is dehydrated with a dry air stream at 200°C, leaving behind crystals of radium bromide. 
Another method is to heat radium chloride and dehydrate it with a dry hydrogen bromide gas stream, but this method is considered more dangerous due to hydrogen bromide's  toxicity and corrosive properties.

Hazards

Radium bromide, like all radium compounds, is highly radioactive and very toxic. Due to its chemical similarity to calcium, radium tends to accumulate in the bones, where it irradiates the bone marrow and can cause anemia, leukemia, sarcoma, bone cancer, genetic defects, infertility, ulcers, and necrosis. Symptoms of poisoning can take years to develop, by which time it is usually too late for any effective medical treatment. Radium bromide also poses a severe environmental hazard, amplified due to its high solubility in water, and it can bioaccumulate and cause long-lasting damage to organisms.

Radium bromide is highly reactive, and crystals can explode if violently shocked or heated. This is, in part, due to self-damage of the crystals by alpha radiation, which weakens the lattice structure.

Uses

Radium and radium salts were commonly used for treating cancer; however, these treatments have been mostly phased out in favor of less toxic chemicals such as technetium or strontium-89. Radium bromide was also used in luminous paint on watches, but its use was ultimately phased out in the 1960-1970s in favor of less dangerous chemicals like promethium and tritium.

See also
Radiation therapy
Ionizing radiation
Radiology

References

Bromides
Alkaline earth metal halides
Explosive chemicals
Radium compounds